Andalgalomys is a genus of rodent in the family Cricetidae. It contains the following species:
 Olrog's chaco mouse (Andalgalomys olrogi)
 Pearson's chaco mouse (Andalgalomys pearsoni)
 Roig's chaco mouse (Andalgalomys roigi)

References

 
Rodent genera
Taxonomy articles created by Polbot